William McCann may refer to:

William McCann (politician) (1879–1961), Australian politician
Bill McCann (1892–1957), Australian soldier and barrister
Billy McCann (1919–2002), American college basketball coach
Sam McCann (William McCann, born 1969), American politician
William McCann (footballer), Scottish footballer

See also
McCann (surname)